Henrik Bjørdal (born 4 February 1997 in Ålesund) is a Norwegian footballer who plays for Vålerenga as a midfielder.

He played youth football for IL Valder. In 2012, he joined the youth team of Aalesunds FK, and was selected for the Norwegian under-15 national team. He made his senior debut for Aalesund as a substitute against Lillestrøm SK in May 2013.

On 27 January 2016, he signed for Brighton & Hove Albion's development squad which predominantly features players under the age of 21.

On 6 March 2017, he signed for the Swedish club IFK Göteborg on loan until the end of the season.

In June 2018 Bjørdal moved to Belgium side Zulte Waregem.

Career statistics

References

1997 births
Living people
Sportspeople from Ålesund
Norwegian footballers
Norway under-21 international footballers
Norway youth international footballers
Eliteserien players
Allsvenskan players
Belgian Pro League players
Aalesunds FK players
Brighton & Hove Albion F.C. players
IFK Göteborg players
S.V. Zulte Waregem players
Vålerenga Fotball players
Norwegian expatriate footballers
Norwegian expatriate sportspeople in England
Expatriate footballers in England
Expatriate footballers in Sweden
Expatriate footballers in Belgium
Association football midfielders